Holly Country, known as the Coalbrook Mining Village until 1996, is a town in Fezile Dabi District Municipality in the Free State province of South Africa.

History
The settlement, located some 5 km from Sasolburg, is a former colliery, and was originally named Coalbrook, probably named after Coalbrookdale in England. It was the scene of the Coalbrook mining disaster on 21 January 1960; 435 workers were buried alive when the mine collapsed.

Richard Hse, a Taiwanese businessman, bought out the old mine village in October 1996, renamed it and turned the place into a hub of factories including clothing, shoes, stoves, wood and paper factories and a sportsfield.

References

Populated places in the Metsimaholo Local Municipality